Parmacella olivieri is a species of air-breathing land slug, a terrestrial pulmonate gastropod mollusk in the family Parmacellidae.

Parmacella olivieri is the type species of the genus Parmacella.

Distribution 
The distribution of this species includes:
 Northern Egypt
 Northern Libya

Description 
The shell is very narrow, thick-walled. The apex is smooth and glossy amber golden. There are several tubercles and wrinkles in the aperture.

The animal is brown with chocolate brown bands on the mantle. The mantle is up to 20 mm long. The whole animal up to 32 mm long.

References
This article incorporates public domain text from the reference.

Further reading 
   Simroth H. (1883) "Anatomie der Parmacella Olivieri Cuv." Jahrbücher der Deutschen Malakozoologischen Gesellschaft 10: 1-46. Plate 1.

Parmacellidae
Gastropods described in 1804
Taxa named by Georges Cuvier